Jujubinus gravinae is a species of sea snail, a marine gastropod mollusk in the family Trochidae, the top snails.

Description
The size of the shell varies between 3 mm and 7.5 mm.

Distribution
This species occurs in the Western Mediterranean Sea and in the Atlantic Ocean off Portugal, the Canary Islands and the Cape Verdes.

References

 Dautzenberg P., 1881: Liste des coquilles recueillies à Cannes par MM. E. et Ad. Dollfus ; Feuille des Jeunes Naturalistes 11: 117–121
 Ghisotti F. & Melone G., 1969–1975: Catalogo illustrato delle conchiglie marine del Mediterraneo; Conchiglie Part 1: suppl. 5 (11–12): 1–28 [1969]. Part 2: suppl. 6 (3–4): 29–46 [1970]. Part 3: suppl. 7 (1–2): 47–77 [1971]. Part 4. suppl. 8 (11–12): 79–144 [1972]. Part 5. suppl. 11 (11–12): 147–208 [1975]
 Gofas, S.; Le Renard, J.; Bouchet, P. (2001). Mollusca, in: Costello, M.J. et al. (Ed.) (2001). European register of marine species: a check-list of the marine species in Europe and a bibliography of guides to their identification. Collection Patrimoines Naturels, 50: pp. 180–213

External links
 

gravinae
Gastropods described in 1881
Molluscs of the Atlantic Ocean
Molluscs of the Mediterranean Sea
Molluscs of the Canary Islands
Gastropods of Cape Verde